Harbeck-Fruitdale was formerly a census-designated place (CDP) in Josephine County, Oregon, United States, near Grants Pass. As of the 2000 census, the CDP population was 3,780. It includes the community of Fruitdale.

Geography

Demographics
As of the census of 2000, there were 3,780 people, 1,553 households, and 1,071 families residing in the CDP. The population density was 2,385.1 people per square mile (923.7/km2). There were 1,655 housing units at an average density of 1,044.3/sq mi (404.4/km2). The racial makeup of the CDP was 93.76% White, 0.24% African American, 1.27% Native American, 0.61% Asian, 0.03% Pacific Islander, 2.17% from other races, and 1.93% from two or more races. Hispanic or Latino of any race were 6.61% of the population.

There were 1,553 households, out of which 27.4% had children under the age of 18 living with them, 53.8% were married couples living together, 11.0% had a female householder with no husband present, and 31.0% were non-families. 24.9% of all households were made up of individuals, and 13.4% had someone living alone who was 65 years of age or older. The average household size was 2.42 and the average family size was 2.83.

In the CDP, the population was spread out, with 23.2% under the age of 18, 6.1% from 18 to 24, 23.3% from 25 to 44, 23.9% from 45 to 64, and 23.6% who were 65 years of age or older. The median age was 43 years. For every 100 females, there were 94.1 males. For every 100 females age 18 and over, there were 92.4 males.

The median income for a household in the CDP was $29,821, and the median income for a family was $35,112. Males had a median income of $32,875 versus $21,193 for females. The per capita income for the CDP was $14,535. About 14.0% of families and 19.2% of the population were below the poverty line, including 32.6% of those under age 18 and 8.3% of those age 65 or over.

References

External links
 History of the Fruitdale Community Church of the Brethren

Unincorporated communities in Josephine County, Oregon
Former census-designated places in Oregon
Unincorporated communities in Oregon